The Countermine System (CMS), also known as Venom Darts, Venom Penetrators and GBU-61, is an anti-land-mine system consisting of chemical or explosive projectiles released from modified GPS-guided bombs. The darts are used to detonate or deactivate land mines in beach and surf zones. The system was developed by the United States (U.S.) Navy and Boeing at an initial cost of US$153-million. The CMS is expected to be field ready by 2016.

Description
The CMS typically consists of 4,000 .50-caliber darts containing the chemical Diethylenetriamine (DETA) or a small amount of explosive, carried by  GPS-guided Joint Direct Attack Munitions (JDAM) systems.

The system uses data from the Coastal Battlefield Reconnaissance and Analysis (COBRA) system to locate surf zone mines. The JDAM bombs, identical in form to BLU-109 bombs, are equipped with a corkscrew mechanism that releases the inner canister with a rotational motion, causing panels to separate and the payload of darts to deploy in a  diameter circular pattern. Remaining unactivated darts eventually become inert.

Each CMS unit has a projected cost of $300,000 to $360,000.

Development
The system was developed by the U.S. Office of Naval Research to address the problem of 70 million hidden land mines, some which have killed or maimed more than 13,000 U.S. soldiers since 2001. In 2008, the Naval Surface Warfare Center awarded a $153-million contract to Boeing to design and develop the system, along with a project team of defense contractors including Lockheed Martin, General Dynamics, and Nammo-Talley Defense Systems. The CMS is expected to be field operational by 2016.

See also
  AMMAD

References

External links
 US Navy - Countermine System Fact Sheet
 Countermine dart system and method - patent grant

Equipment of the United States Navy
Mine warfare countermeasures
Military technology